Mambaram may refer to:

 Mambaram, Malappuram, India
 Mambaram, Kannur, India